The Academy of Medicine, Engineering & Science of Texas (TAMEST) is a not-for-profit interdisciplinary scientific organization, whose membership consists of all Texas-based members of the three national academies, including ten Nobel laureates.

Mission 
TAMEST's mission is "to provide broader recognition of the state's top achievers in medicine, engineering and science, and to build a stronger identity for Texas as an important destination and center of achievement in these fields."

Membership 

TAMEST consists of all of the Texas-based members of the three national academies: the National Academy of Sciences, the National Academy of Engineering, and the National Institute of Medicine.  The officers of the Board of Directors are Michael S. Brown, Kay Bailey Hutchison, David E. Daniel, J. Tinsley Oden, Francisco G. Cigarroa, William "Bill" R. Brinkley, and John Mendelsohn.

The Nobel laureate members of TAMEST include Norman E. Borlaug, Michael S. Brown, Robert F. Curl, Johann Deisenhofer, Alfred G. Gilman, Joseph Goldstein, Dudley R. Herschbach, Russell A. Hulse, Ferid Murad, and Steven Weinberg.

In addition, the organization has an Industry and Community Affiliates Committee; the co-chairmen of the committee are Ernest H. Cockrell, Michael S. Dell, and Thomas J. Engibous.

Influence 
Because of the collective scientific prestige of the organization's members, TAMEST's recommendations are closely watched by policy-makers, both in Texas and nationally.  TAMEST has been most active in promoting mathematics and science education at the K-12 level.

Education Initiative 
In December 2008, TAMEST released The Next Frontier: World-Class Math and Science Education for Texas. This report is meant as Texas' response to Rising Above the Gathering Storm, a publication of the national academies which predicts that unless the United States changes the course of its math and science education, its economic leadership will not last into the next century.

The Next Frontier makes several recommendations:
Texas must provide STEM teachers with enough training, support and pay—so they will come and stay
Texas must do more to interest students in STEM fields and help interested students pursue STEM careers
Texas must help ensure students' continued success in STEM—from college to careers
Texas must make improving STEM education an even higher priority

The Next Frontier also describes ten "programs that get an A+."  These are UTeach, Advanced Placement (AP) Strategies, Santa Cruz New Teacher Project (SCNTP), Reasoning Mind, Teach For America (TFA), The Infinity Project, For Inspiration and Recognition of Science and Technology (FIRST), Project Lead the Way (PLTW), Laying the Foundation, Joint Admission Medical Program (JAMP), and Career and Technical Education (CTE).

The Edith and Peter O'Donnell Award 
The Edith and Peter O'Donnell Awards, named for Peter O'Donnell and his wife, the former Edith Jones, are distributed annually by TAMEST to recognize outstanding achievements by young investigators in medicine, engineering, science, and technological innovation.  The awards have been given since 2006, with the exception of the technology innovation award, which first appeared in 2008.

References

Scientific organizations based in the United States
Non-profit organizations based in Texas
Organizations based in Austin, Texas
Organizations established in 2004
2004 establishments in Texas